The Marlow-Hunter 18 is an American sailing dinghy that was designed by Glenn Henderson as a day sailer and first built in 2011.

The Marlow-Hunter 18 replaced the similar Hunter 170 in production.

The design was originally marketed by the manufacturer in 2011 as the Hunter 18, but, emerging from bankruptcy, the company became Marlow-Hunter in 2012 and the design was re-designated as the Marlow-Hunter 18.

Production
The design was built by Hunter Marine and later Marlow-Hunter in the United States, starting in 2011 and remained in production through 2019.

Design
The Marlow-Hunter 18 differs form the Hunter 170 in that it has more length and more waterline length, a higher length to beam ratio and more sail area.

The Marlow-Hunter 18 is a small recreational dinghy, built predominantly of fiberglass, with a balsa-cored deck and hull. The hull has a hard chine and a bow hollow. It has a cuddy space covered with a snap-fastener canvas cover for stowage. It has a fractional sloop rig, a plumb stem, an open reverse transom, a transom-hung swing-up rudder controlled by a tiller with an extension and a folding centerboard keel.

The boat has no provisions for mounting a motor.

Factory standard equipment includes a jib and a loose-footed mainsail. Factory options include a gennaker.

Operational history
Writing for Sailing magazine in July 2011, famed yacht designer Robert Perry concluded at the 18, "I think this would be an ideal boat to use to teach kids how to sail. It has the look of a modern sport boat with its plumb stem and open transom. With the spinnaker option you should be able to get good performance out of the boat and kids can learn the full range of basic sailing skills in a boat that won't overpower them."

In a review for Sail magazine also in July 2011, writer Charles Doane sailed the boat with Steve Pettengill, "who serves as Hunter’s unofficial Director of Destructive Testing". Doane noted, "Though over-canvassed, the boat handled very well. Steering was precise, and we had no trouble keeping upright by playing the main when sailing on the wind. The controls are simple, effective and easy to handle. The high boom makes it unnecessary to duck when tacking, and a substantial centerline toerail and comfortably curved cockpit coaming make it easy to push your body out quickly to windward when heeling. The only thing lacking is a centerline hiking strap to hook your feet under, but this would be easy to retrofit." After the sail he concluded, "I feel I can recommend this boat highly. Handled by sane people, it would be lots of fun to just knock around in. Obviously, it’s a blast to sail in the heavy stuff as well."

See also
List of sailing boat types

Related development
Hunter 146
Hunter 170

References

External links

Keelboats
2010s sailboat type designs
Sailing yachts
Sailboat type designs by Glenn Henderson
Sailboat types built by Hunter Marine